Charles Sigoto (born February 11, 1957) is a Solomon Islands politician.

He was born in Koriovuku Village, Ranongga Island, Western Province. After graduating from the College of Allied Health Sciences in Papua New Guinea, he worked as a director of nursing.

His career in national politics began when he was elected to Parliament as the member for the Rannonga/Simbo constituency in the 2010 general election, standing for the Reformed Democratic Party. He was then appointed Minister of Health and Medical Services in Prime Minister Danny Philip's Cabinet. When Gordon Darcy Lilo replaced Philip as Prime Minister in November 2011, Sigoto retained his position in government.

He was re-elected as a Member of Parliament for Rannogga/Simbo in the 2019 general election.

References

1957 births
Living people
Members of the National Parliament of the Solomon Islands
People from the Western Province (Solomon Islands)
Solomon Islands Democratic Party politicians
Health ministers of the Solomon Islands